Myrtle Beach Atlantic Coast Line Railroad Depot is a historic train station located at Myrtle Beach in Horry County, South Carolina. It was built in 1937 by the Atlantic Coast Line Railroad, and is one-story rectangular building was constructed with the standard ACL bi-level floor plan that has a raised freight room with steps leading down to the lobby/office area.  It features exterior architectural detailing reflecting Colonial Revival, Craftsman, and Mission stylistic influences.

It was listed on the National Register of Historic Places in 2002.

Prior passenger services
Until 1955 the Atlantic Coast Line Railroad ran passenger rail service from the station to Chadbourn, North Carolina, where a connection could be made to a train bound for Florence, South Carolina, Sumter, South Carolina and Columbia's Union Station to the west, and Wilmington, North Carolina to the east.  At the start of the 1950s the train went beyond Chadbourn to Elrod, North Carolina, where a connection could be made to the ACL's Palmetto. From 1955, onward, there was only freight service from Myrtle Beach.

Restoration effort
Trains used the nearby train yard until 1971. The last freight train used the depot in 1988, and after that it became a beer distributor's warehouse. When it appeared the depot would be torn down, the city bought it for $750,000 in 2000. A concrete block addition came down in 2001 as efforts began to have the property named to the National Register. By the time the designation was achieved, the All Aboard Committee had raised $470,000 of the $677,000 restoration cost. The depot opened as a museum May 6, 2004. A. Dale Gilliland, AIA volunteered his services as architect to restore the depot.

References

External links

Myrtle Beach Atlantic Coast Line Railroad Station - Myrtle Beach, South Carolina - U.S. National Register of Historic Places on Waymarking.com

Railway stations on the National Register of Historic Places in South Carolina
Railway stations in the United States opened in 1935
Buildings and structures in Myrtle Beach, South Carolina
Atlantic Coast Line Railroad stations
Transportation in Horry County, South Carolina
National Register of Historic Places in Horry County, South Carolina
1935 establishments in South Carolina
Former railway stations in South Carolina